Erich Isaac (September 21, 1928 – November 5, 2021) was a prominent Jewish Fighter for the Freedom of Israel, the first chairman of Americans for a Safe Israel (AFSI), professor and author.

Biography
Born into an Orthodox Jewish home in Mainz, Germany, Isaac emigrated with his parents to Mandatory Palestine when he was nine years old. He joined the Fighters around the time of his bar mitzvah, but was so young that he was only allowed to be a lookout during operations. His parents were opposed to him being a part of the resistance, fearing for his safety.

Isaac received his PhD, studying geography in species domestication. He studied at the University of Colorado at Boulder and then at Johns Hopkins University, where he also met his wife. He became a professor and taught at Temple University and then City College of New York.

Publications

Books
Isaac, Erich. (1967) The Enigma of Circumcision
Isaac, Erich. (1970) Geography of Domestication 
Isaac, Rael Jean; Isaac, Erich. (1981) Sanctifying Revolution: Mainline Churchmen Turn Radical 
Isaac, Rael Jean; Isaac, Erich. (1983) The Coercive Utopians: Social Deception by America's Power Players

Selected publications
On the Domestication of Cattle, July 1962
Myths, Cults and Livestock Breeding, March 1963
A Basic Jewish Encyclopedia, by Harry A. Cohen; The Encyclopedia of the Jewish Religion, edited by R. J. Zwi Werblowsky and Geof, April 1967
You Shall Be As Gods, by Erich Fromm, May 1967
The Loneliest Jews of All, August 1968
Prayer in Judaism, by Bernard Martin, August 1969
Wanderings, by Chaim Potok, April 1979
"With All Your Possessions": Jewish Ethics and Economic Life, by Meir Tamari, October 1987

References

1928 births
2021 deaths
Israeli writers
Israeli activists
German Jews
Israeli people of German-Jewish descent
People from Mainz